The following is a list of all suspensions and fines enforced in the National Hockey League (NHL) during the 2018–19 NHL season. It lists which players or coaches of what team have been punished for which offense and the amount of punishment they have received.

Based on each player's average annual salary, divided by number of days in the season (186) for non-repeat offenders and games (82) for repeat offenders, salary will be forfeited for the term of their suspension. Players' money forfeited due to suspension or fine goes to the Players' Emergency Assistance Fund, while money forfeited by coaches, staff or organizations as a whole go to the NHL Foundation.

Suspensions
† - suspension covered at least one 2018 NHL preseason game
‡ - suspension covered at least one 2019 postseason game
# - Suspension was later reduced upon further review/successful appeal; information presented in italics
 - Player was considered a repeat offender under the terms of the Collective Bargaining Agreement (player had been suspended in the 18 months prior to this suspension)

Notes
1. All figures are in US dollars.
2. As players are not paid salary in the preseason or postseason, no fines are generated for games lost due to suspension during those periods.
3. Fines generated for games lost due to suspension for off-ice conduct are calculated uniquely and irrespective of repeat offender status.
4. Suspension accompanied by mandatory referral to the NHL/NHLPA Program for Substance Abuse and Behavioral Health.
5. Watson's original suspension was for 27 games, plus the remaining 6 games of the preseason. The suspension was appealed by Watson on September 20, 2018. On October 12, 2018, NHL/NHLPA Neutral Discipline Arbitrator, Shyam Das, overruled the NHL Commissioner Gary Bettman's 27 regular season game suspension down to 18 regular season games. The NHL and NHLPA agreed to use Das as a neutral discipline arbitrator on an ad hoc basis as regular arbitrator George Nicolau was unavailable.
6. Suspension was appealed by Wilson on October 5, 2018. On October 25, 2018, NHL Commissioner Gary Bettman announced he had heard the appeal and was upholding the original 20 game suspension levied to Wilson. The NHLPA then appealed to neutral arbitrator on behalf of Wilson, on October 26. On November 13, 2018, NHL/NHLPA Neutral Discipline Arbitrator, Shyam Das, overruled the NHL Commissioner Gary Bettman's 20 regular season game suspension down to 14 regular season games. The NHL and NHLPA agreed to use Das as a neutral discipline arbitrator on an ad hoc basis as regular arbitrator George Nicolau was unavailable. Though Wilson had already missed 16 of his originally assessed 20 games before Das' decision was made, his suspension will stand as 14 games in the NHL records and his salary was refunded for the 2 games he missed.
7. Indefinite suspension accompanied by mandatory referral to the NHL/NHLPA Program for Substance Abuse and Behavioral Health - Stage 2. Suspension completed only upon being cleared for on-ice competition by the program administrators. Watson was reinstated by the NHL/NHPLA on March 18, 2019, after 49 days and 21 games missed. As part of his reinstatement, Watson was entered into the follow-up care phase of the Substance Abuse and Behavioral Health Program.
8. Suspension was appealed by Voracek on March 11, 2019; Voracek applied for an expedited appeal, due to the short nature of the suspension. On March 13, 2019, NHL Commissioner Gary Bettman announced he had heard the appeal and was upholding the original 2 game suspension levied to Voracek. As Voracek's suspension was fewer than 6 games, per the Collective Bargaining Agreement, the Commissioner's decision was final and binding and not subject to review, and the NHLPA was not allowed to appeal to a neutral arbitrator on Voracek's behalf.
9.Nazem Kadri was suspended for the remainder of the first round of the 2019 Stanley Cup Playoffs. At the time of the suspension, the number of games for the suspension could have ranged from 3 to 5 games.

Fines
Players can be fined up to 50% of one day's salary, up to a maximum of $10,000.00 for their first offense, and $15,000.00 for any subsequent offenses (player had been fined in the 12 months prior to this fine). Coaches, non-playing personnel, and teams are not restricted to such maximums.

Fines for players/coaches fined for diving/embellishment are structured uniquely and are only handed out after non-publicized warnings are given to the player/coach for their first offense. For more details on diving/embellishment fines:

 For coach incident totals, each citation issued to a player on his club counts toward his total.
 All figures are in US dollars.

Fines listed in italics indicate that was the maximum allowed fine.

Notes
1. All figures are in US dollars.
2. Rantanen was issued his first citation following an incident on October 16, 2018.
3. Meier was issued his first citation following an incident on February 5, 2019.
4. Miller was issued his first citation following an incident on November 23, 2018.

Further reading

See also 
 2017–18 NHL suspensions and fines
 2019–20 NHL suspensions and fines
 2018 in sports
 2019 in sports
 2018–19 NHL season
 2018–19 NHL transactions

References

External links
NHL Collective Bargaining Agreement

Suspension and Fines
National Hockey League suspensions and fines